Cuphea hyssopifolia, the false heather, Mexican heather, Hawaiian heather  or elfin herb, is a small evergreen shrub native to Mexico, Guatemala, and Honduras.

Description
Its leaves are small, narrow and dark green. The fruit is a capsule that contains small globose seeds.

The Latin specific epithet hyssopifolia (which also occurs in several other plant names, including that of Bassia hyssopifolia) means "hyssop-leafed", referring to the fine, narrow leaves of that plant.

Habitat
It is present in hot, semi-warm and temperate climates between 500 and 2240 meters above sea level. An ornamental plant grown in orchards and gardens, it grows on the banks of streams, associated with disturbed vegetation of tropical deciduous and sub-deciduous forests, as well as mountain mesophilic forest.

The species is naturalised in Hawaii, and regarded as a serious weed there.

Cultivation
In cultivation, the species adapts to a range of soils in a sunny or partially shaded situation with good drainage. It can be cultivated outdoors in USDA hardiness zones 8B-11, but does not tolerate freezing temperatures. In colder regions it may be cultivated as an annual. Plants may be propagated by cuttings, layering or division. They seed freely, and new seedlings that appear are easily transplanted.

This plant has gained the Royal Horticultural Society's Award of Garden Merit (confirmed 2020).

References

External links

Data Sheet Resource: Cuphea hysoppifolia

hyssopifolia
Flora of Mexico
Flora of Guatemala
Flora of Honduras